Ås is a village in Birkenes municipality in Agder county, Norway.

References

Villages in Agder
Birkenes